The Tête de Ferret is a mountain of the Pennine Alps on the Swiss-Italian border. It lies just east of the Mont Blanc massif, between the Swiss Val Ferret (Valais) and the Italian Val Ferret (Aosta Valley).

References

External links
 Tête de Ferret on Hikr

Mountains of the Alps
Mountains of Switzerland
Mountains of Italy
Italy–Switzerland border
International mountains of Europe
Mountains of Valais
Two-thousanders of Switzerland